The Hartman Prehistoric Garden is a botanical garden within the Zilker Botanical Garden in Austin, Texas, USA.

In January 1992 Karen and Dr. Mike Duffin discovered dinosaur footprints in Zilker Park in a quarry which had recently been cleared for the installation of a butterfly garden.  Dr. Duffin contacted Professor Wann Langston, Director Emeritus of the Vertebrate Paleontology Laboratory of the Texas Memorial Museum.  The fossils of more than 100 preserved tracks made by six or seven prehistoric reptiles, along with the bones of an ancient turtle were discovered. Immediately they began to study the best means of preserving the tracks. They were mapped and casts were made, and then they were reburied to prevent further deterioration due to exposure to the elements. A major funding drive was undertaken and many volunteers helped to develop the site and  around it as a Cretaceous habitat. The plants chosen to populate the garden were those believed to have existed at the time the dinosaurs would have walked through the area, including ferns, horsetails, liverworts, cycads, conifers, ginkgos, as well as magnolias and palms. Over 100 species in all were carefully landscaped around the area.

A life-size sculpture of an Ornithomimus, the species of dinosaur believed to have left the tracks, stands in the center of the gardens.

References

External links 

History of Austin, Texas
Culture of Austin, Texas
1990s establishments in Texas